The Ford Fiesta Mk7 (Mk8 in the United Kingdom) is the seventh and last generation of the Ford Fiesta supermini. Originally introduced in 2016, it was Ford Europe's multi-national front-wheel-drive automobile, and was available in both 3-door hatchback and panel van derivatives. In 2018, the Ford Fiesta ST was released, and the model underwent a facelift in 2022.

Production
On November 29, 2016, the seventh-generation Fiesta (Mark VII, or Mark VIII in UK) was announced in Germany, being bigger, roomier, safer, more efficient, and more upmarket. The Fiesta range expanded to include new additions - a crossover-styled variant called the Fiesta Active, and the luxury Fiesta Vignale.

Unlike previous generations, the Fiesta has been phased out from North America, South America, Australasia, and Asia, according to Ford, due to the popularity of crossover SUVs, pickup trucks and sports cars, such as the Ranger, Everest, Mustang and Escape. However, the Ford Fiesta ST continued to be sold in Australia due to popularity.

Safety

The Fiesta in its standard European configuration received 5 stars from Euro NCAP in 2017.

Fiesta ST (2018–present)

On February 24, 2017, the seventh-generation Fiesta ST was announced. It features an all-new 200 PS three-cylinder, 1.5-litre Ecoboost engine with turbocharger and cylinder deactivation technology.

On March 12, 2018, Ford announced that a Quaife limited-slip differential would be offered for the first time on the Fiesta ST as part of an optional "Performance Pack". The pack also includes a "ST" shift-change light in the instrument cluster and launch control.

The all-new Fiesta ST also includes three selectable driving modes, a first for the model. These include "Normal", "Sport", and "Race Track". Each mode changes the characteristics of the car, including the steering feel, throttle response, deactivating the engine 'start-stop' feature, and opening the flap in the exhaust, which increases the sound of the car.

The Fiesta ST was released on May 7, 2018. From launch, it is available in either a three-door or five-door body style, and comes standard with a six-speed manual gearbox, with no option of an automatic. On April 1, 2019, the Fiesta ST-1 was discontinued, leaving only the ST-2 and ST-3 models.

In April 2019, Ford announced a new limited-edition model to the ST range called the "Performance Edition". Although named "Performance", the Fiesta ST does not gain any power upgrades to the standard ST. The car is based on the ST-3 model and comes with multiple options that would normally be a cost option to an ST, such as LED headlights, B&O sound system, and Performance Pack. To differentiate the Performance Edition, the car comes with exclusive options, namely standard Deep Orange paint, lowered and adjustable ride height, and lighter multispoke alloy wheels.

The Ford Fiesta ST won Top Gears Hot Hatch and Car of the Year for 2018.

October 2020, Ford unveiled a new, special edition version of the Fiesta ST called the "Edition", limited to 300 for UK and 500 for Europe. Similar specification to the "Performance Edition" Only available in Azura Blue, with Gloss Black detailing including wheels, rear diffuser, roof and spoiler.

2022 facelift 
In September 2021, Ford announced and released images of the facelifted Ford Fiesta, and Fiesta ST due to be released at the beginning of 2022. The new models come with a new front bumper, other visual modifications and a new 'Wrong Way Alert' safety feature over the previous model. The higher specification models also include increased torque, matrix LED headlights and upgraded technology like a fully digital instrument binnacle.

The 3-door Fiesta was discontinued during Spring 2022.

On 26 October 2022, Ford announced that the Fiesta would end production by June 2023 to make way for future electric vehicles to be released by Ford, with no plans to replace the Fiesta, thus making the 7th generation the final generation of the Fiesta.

Powertrain

Marketing 
On July 20, 2017, Ford UK released an advertisement of the Fiesta featuring actress Keeley Hawes.

Discontinuation 
Ford executives in October 2022 announced that the Fiesta is set to be discontinued by mid-2023, as costs of parts rise and drivers opt for SUVs, and the company wants to focus on electrification of its vehicles.

References

Cars introduced in 2017
7th
2020s cars
Front-wheel-drive vehicles
Hatchbacks
Vans
Subcompact cars